The Alma Downtown Historic District in Alma, Kansas, a  historic district in Alma, Kansas, was listed on the National Register of Historic Places in 2009.  It includes 21 contributing buildings.

It is located along Missouri St., from 2nd to 5th Streets, and includes Italianate and other architecture.  It includes a post office and a fire station, as well as commercial buildings.

Most of the buildings are two-part or one-part commercial block buildings.

References

Historic districts on the National Register of Historic Places in Kansas
Italianate architecture in Kansas
Romanesque Revival architecture in Kansas
Buildings and structures completed in 1887
Wabaunsee County, Kansas